Miriam Meckel (born 18 July 1967) is a German journalist and professor for Corporate Communication, editor and publisher of the German magazine Wirtschaftswoche  and Director of the Institute for Media and Communication Management at the University of St. Gallen in Switzerland.

In November 2014, Meckel was appointed editor-in-chief of Germany's leading business weekly Wirtschaftswoche, as the first woman to hold that position. In April 2017, she became the publisher of the magazine.

From 2001 to 2005, Meckel served as the State Secretary at the department of the Premier of the German State of North Rhine-Westphalia and government spokeswoman, and later the State Secretary for Europe, International Affairs and Media. From 1999 to 2001 she was a professor of communication sciences at the University of Münster in Germany. Her publications include texts on media economics, communication, and cyberpolitics; in 2010 she wrote about her experience with burn-out syndrome. Her book became the basis for an award-winning television movie in 2016.

As a member of the international jury for the Development Gateway Foundation of the World Bank, Meckel was instrumental in designing the Development Gateway Award (Petersberg Prize).

In November 2001 Meckel received the Cicero Award for best speech in the academia category.

Publications (extract)
 1994: Fernsehen ohne Grenzen? Europas Fernsehen zwischen Integration und Segmentierung
 1996: Internationale Kommunikation - eine Einführung
 1998: Fernsehnachrichten. Strukturen, Funktionen, Prozesse
 1999: Redaktionsmanagement. Ansätze aus Theorie und Praxis
 1999: with Klaus Kamps, Patrick Rössler and Werner Gephart: Medien-Mythos? Die Inszenierung von Prominenz und Schicksal am Beispiel von Diana Spencer
 2000: with Marianne Ravenstein: Cyberworlds. Computerwelten der Zukunft
 2001: Die globale @genda. Kommunikation und Globalisierung
 2005: Cyberpolitics and Cyberpolity, Zur Virtualisierung politischer Kommunikation
 2007: Das Glück der Unerreichbarkeit, Wege aus der Kommunikationsfalle
 2010: Brief an mein Leben: Erfahrungen mit einem Burnout
 2011: 'NEXT - Erinnerungen an eine Zukunft ohne uns'

Personal
Meckel lives in St. Gallen, Switzerland and Berlin, Germany. She was married to Anne Will, a German television journalist from 2016 to 2019.

References 

1967 births
German LGBT writers
Living people
German LGBT journalists
German women journalists
German women writers
German women academics
German business and financial journalists
German expatriates in Switzerland
Academic staff of the University of Münster
Academic staff of the University of St. Gallen
LGBT academics
Wirtschaftswoche editors